Patrick Marie Ghislain Pierre Simon Stanislas Nève de Mévergnies (13 October 1949 – 12 March 2017) was a Belgian racing driver.  He participated in 14 Formula One Grands Prix, debuting on 16 May 1976. He was notable for being the first driver for Williams Grand Prix Engineering.  He scored no championship points. His younger brother, Guy, was also a racing driver.

Career
After some success in Formula Ford and Formula 3, Nève initially moved up to Formula One with RAM, driving a Brabham.  After a one-off drive with Ensign, he spent 1977 with newly formed Williams Grand Prix Engineering, driving a March with very little in the way of results.  The following year he tried to enter his own March in his home grand prix, but it was not authorized.

Racing record

Complete European Formula Two Championship results
(key)

Complete Formula One results
(key)

Complete World Endurance Championship results
(key)

Footnotes

Complete British Formula One Championship results
(key)

24 Hours of Le Mans results

References

1949 births
2017 deaths
Belgian racing drivers
Belgian Formula One drivers
British Formula One Championship drivers
European Formula Two Championship drivers
24 Hours of Le Mans drivers
Sportspeople from Liège
RAM Racing Formula One drivers
Ensign Formula One drivers
Williams Formula One drivers
World Sportscar Championship drivers
Walloon sportspeople
20th-century Belgian people